Tammy and the Bachelor is a 1957 romantic comedy film directed by Joseph Pevney and starring Debbie Reynolds as Tambrey "Tammy" Tyree, Walter Brennan as Grandpa Dinwitty and Leslie Nielsen as Peter Brent. It is the first of the four Tammy films. It was adapted from the 1948 novel Tammy Out of Time by Cid Ricketts Sumner.

Plot
Tambrey "Tammy" Tyree (Debbie Reynolds) is a seventeen-year-old girl living in a houseboat on the
Mississippi River at Natchez, Mississippi (within sight of Louisiana) with her Grandpa, John Dinwitty (Walter Brennan). She runs around barefoot, dreaming of life outside of the swamp, and talking to her best friend, Nan, a goat.

One day a small airplane crashes in the swamp. Tammy and her grandfather go to see what they can salvage from the wreck and find the unconscious pilot, Peter Brent (Leslie Nielsen).  Tammy and her grandfather help Peter recover at their home, during which time Tammy falls in love with Peter. However, he must return to his own home, but he tells the grandfather that, if anything happened to the grandfather, Tammy would be welcome to come and stay with Peter at his spacious house at Natchez.
 
Several weeks later, Tammy's grandfather is arrested for making moonshine. With no one else to stay with, Tammy sets off for Brentwood Hall, Peter's home. She arrives during a dance rehearsal and sees Peter with his friends. When Peter's friend Ernie discovers Tammy outside of the party, Tammy tries to explain her grandfather's imprisonment; however, Peter misunderstands and tells Mrs. Brent (Fay Wray) that Tammy's grandfather has died, leading the Brents to take her in. Tammy learns that Peter is busy with "Brentwood #6", an experimental tomato he is growing in hopes of making Brentwood Hall self-sustaining once again. After Tammy finally tells everyone that her grandfather isn't actually dead, Mrs. Brent is upset over Tammy announcing to everyone that she has a relative in jail. However, Peter and his Aunt Renie convince Tammy to stay, leading her to sing of her love for Peter ("Tammy").

Barbara Bissle, Peter's fiancee, drops by Brentwood Hall. Her uncle wants Peter to stop experimenting with tomatoes and offers him a deal to come to work with him in the advertising business. Peter turns down the offer. That week is also Natchez Pilgrimage Week, which includes a ball and tours of Brentwood Hall, all while in costume. Renie gives Tammy the dress Peter's great-grandmother wore. Mrs. Brent and Renie suggest that Tammy pretend to be Great-Grandmother Cratchett for the evening. At the Ball that night, Tammy tells a story for the guests and enchants everyone, even Mrs. Brent.

That night, a hail storm hits Brentwood Hall and destroys all of the Brentwood #6 plants. The next morning, Peter announces that he is going to accept the advertising offer, leading Tammy to run away back to the bayou. As Peter realizes he loves Tammy, he calls off his engagement with Barbara, then finds Tammy's grandfather and secures his release. The two men then return to the houseboat, where Peter reconciles with Tammy and they kiss.

Cast
 Debbie Reynolds as Tambrey "Tammy" Tyree
 Leslie Nielsen as Peter Brent
 Walter Brennan as Grandpa (John) Dinwitty
 Mala Powers as Barbara Bissle
 Sidney Blackmer as Professor Brent
 Mildred Natwick as Aunt Renie
 Fay Wray as Mrs. Brent
 Philip Ober as Alfred Bissle
 Craig Hill as Ernie
 Louise Beavers as Osia, the cook
 April Kent as Tina

Production
Leslie Nielsen was borrowed from MGM to play the male lead. Joseph Pevney directed under the first of a new five picture contract with Universal. Filming began in April 1956.

Awards
Jay Livingston and Ray Evans were nominated for an Oscar for their song "Tammy", sung over the film's main titles by The Ames Brothers.  Its naive sentimentality has proved an irresistible target for parody, most notably in Stan Freberg's "Madison Ave. Werewolf": "When I hold your sweet, hairy hands tight in mine... Clammy! Clammy!".

Reynolds placed second for a Golden Laurel for Top Female Comedy Performance. The film itself was awarded third place for a Golden Laurel for Top Comedy.

Additionally, Reynolds's single version of the film's title song (as heard later in the movie) became an across-the-music-charts #1 hit 45 release, on Coral Records.

See also
 List of American films of 1957

References

External links
 
 
 
 

1957 films
1957 romantic comedy films
1950s teen films
American romantic comedy films
Tammy (film series)
Films based on American novels
Films directed by Joseph Pevney
Films produced by Ross Hunter
Films set in Mississippi
Films shot in New Orleans
Universal Pictures films
CinemaScope films
Films scored by Frank Skinner
1950s English-language films
1950s American films